The Oakley-class lifeboat refers to two types of self-righting lifeboat operated by the Royal National Lifeboat Institution (RNLI) around the coast of the United Kingdom and Ireland between 1958 and 1993. The  Oakley was designed for carriage launching, while the larger  version was designed for slipway launching or to lie afloat. During their service they saved a combined total of 1,456 lives in 3,734 rescue launches.

The class is known by the name of its designer, RNLI naval architect Richard Oakley.

History
During the first half of the twentieth century the RNLI had equipped its lifeboat stations with motor lifeboats designed by G L Watson and, later, J R Barnett. Both these men had designed boats that were generally stable, but unlike the earlier  boats, were not self-righting. Part of the problem was that motor lifeboats were much heavier than pulling and sailing boats, which could be packed with cork to make them buoyant. Richard Oakley worked out how to use shifting water ballast to create a self-righting motor lifeboat.

The last  was built in 1960 and the final  in 1963, after which Oakleys were the only all-weather lifeboats put into service for the next four years.

Design
The Oakley was designed as a self-righting boat. The design combined great stability with the ability to self-right in the event of it capsizing. This was achieved by a system of shifting water ballast. The system worked by the lifeboat taking on one and half tons of sea water at launching in to a tank built into the base of the hull. If the lifeboat then reached a crucial point of capsize the ballast water would transfer through valves to a righting tank built into the port side. If the capsize was to the starboard side of the lifeboat, the water shift started when an angle of 165° was reached. This would push the boat into completing a full 360° roll. If the capsize was to the port side, the water transfer started at 110°. In this case the weight of water combined with the weight of machinery aboard the lifeboat usually managed to stop the roll and allow the lifeboat to bounce back to upright. The water was discharged from the tank when the ship was taken out of the sea after each launch. A problem emerged with damp sand left in the tank after the water was drained. This caused a weak electrolytic action that eroded the copper nails which held the wooden hulls together.

The hull of the Oakley class was constructed from two wooden skins with a layer of calico between. After several years it was found that the calico absorbed water which caused softening of the wood around the copper nails. This led to a series of surveys in the late 1980s and the withdrawal of some boats, or replanking of others. The skins were made from diagonally laid African Mahogany planks. The keel was iron and weighed 1.154 tons. The hull was divided into eleven watertight compartments. Two sizes were built. It displaced 12.05 tons when fully laden with crew and gear.

The 48ft 6in Oakley

After five years production of the 37ft boat, the RNLI decided to extend the water ballast self-righting principal to a larger boat suitable for slipway launching and lying afloat. In 1962 a prototype boat was built, 48-01 Earl and Countess Howe (ON 968) and in appearance it resembled an extended  with a long tapering superstructure running forward from an aft cockpit which was covered, but open to the stern. The boat's water ballast system used 2 tons of water compared to 1 tons in the smaller boats. Power came from two 110 bhp Gardner 6LX six cylinder diesel engines, the redesigned and uprated version of the engine fitted to the last ten 52ft  class boats. It was four years before further examples were built, by which time a major redesign of the superstructure had resulted in the Mk. II version. In this an enclosed wheelhouse was positioned amidships, accessed by sliding doors on either side at the forward end. Behind the wheelhouse was an aft cabin which could accommodate a loaded stretcher. Initially, radio aerials were rigged between the foremast and a bipod mast at the back of the aft cabin, on the roof of which the radar scanner was mounted on a pylon.

Attention now turned to a steel-hulled development of the 48 ft 6 in Oakley which would dispense with the complex water ballast system and achieve its self-righting capability from a watertight superstructure. This emerged as the  class and initial orders for eight boats were placed with Operational Numbers following on from the Oakleys (48-004 to 48-011, the three digit second part of the number indicating a metal hull). Two final Oakleys were then ordered, taking Operational Numbers 48-12 and 48-13.

Like the smaller boats, the 48 ft 6 in Oakleys were prone to hull deterioration through electrolysis and were not considered for sale for further use. Initially, all five boats were put on display at various locations, but two, 48-01 and 48-13 were subsequently broken up. After ten years on display, 48-12 was sold to a private owner who removed the water ballast system and put the boat back on the water, leaving 48-02 and 48-03 on public display at Lands End and Hythe Marina respectively. 48-02 James and Catherine MacFarlane after being out in the open at Lands End since 1988, has been sold to a private owner in July 2016 and moved to Berkshire for restoration.

Fleet

37 foot boats

48 foot 6 inch boats
All built by William Osborne, Littlehampton except ON 989, Berthon Boat Co., Lymington

References

External links

 RNLI